Ishag Mammadrza oglu Jafarzadeh (August 14, 1895 in Ganja – January 5, 1982 in Baku) was one of the pioneers of Azerbaijan archaeology and ethnography. He excavated over seventy artifacts on Azerbaijan's territory and studied the Gobustan rock paintings. In 1948, during the Gobustan expedition, he discovered the Latin rock inscription near mountain Boyukdash, 70 km from Baku, which is the easternmost Roman evidence to be known.

Notes

Works
"Azərbaycanın qədim tarixi" ("Ancient History of Azerbaijan"), Azərb. SSR EA Tarix və Fəlsəfə İnstitutunun əsərləri, c. 1, B., 1961
Историко-археологический очерк очерк старой Ганджи (Родина Низами) (Historico-Archaeological Sketch on Old Ganja), Б., 1949
Гобустан. Наскальные изображения (Gobustan. The Rock Paintings), Б., 1973

1895 births
1982 deaths
20th-century archaeologists
People from Ganja, Azerbaijan
Baku State University alumni
Recipients of the Order of the Red Banner of Labour
Azerbaijani archaeologists

Azerbaijani ethnographers
Soviet archaeologists
Soviet ethnographers